Apamea illyria is a moth of the  family Noctuidae. It is found in much of Europe, western Siberia, Turkey, and the Caucasus.

The wingspan is 31–36 mm. Adults are on wing May to July.

The larvae feed on Calamagrostis, Dactylis, and Deschampsia species, as well as Milium effusum.

References

External links

Moths and Butterflies of Europe and North Africa
Lepiforum.de

Apamea (moth)
Moths of Europe
Moths of Asia
Taxa named by Christian Friedrich Freyer
Moths described in 1846
Use of the term Illyrian in modern history